The Invaders is an American science-fiction television series created by Larry Cohen that aired on ABC for two seasons, from 1967 to 1968. Roy Thinnes stars as David Vincent,  who after stumbling across evidence of an in-progress invasion of aliens from outer space—the aliens disguising themselves as humans and gradually infiltrating human institutions—tries to thwart the invasion despite the disbelief of officials and the general public, and the undermining of his efforts by the aliens. The series was a Quinn Martin production.

Plot
Roy Thinnes stars as architect David Vincent, who accidentally learns of a secret alien invasion already underway and thereafter travels from place to place attempting to foil the aliens' plots and warn a skeptical populace of the danger. A plot format of a man-on-the-run and of a lone man attempting to warn the human public about alien infiltration, are shared from The Fugitive, and Coronet Blue two former Quinn Martin's productions, and 50's movies like Invasion of the Body Snatchers and I Married a Monster from Outer Space, respectively. Other plot elements include Vincent's grim and lonely determination to find "tangible proof of the invaders’ existence" despite having become a "quasi-famous object of public ridicule";  the aliens' success in hiding their plots, undermining Vincent's credibility and killing off those who also discover them in ways disguised as a natural death; the constant tension over whether the individuals Vincent comes across are humans or aliens. As the series progresses, Vincent is able to convince a small number of people to help him fight the aliens.

In many episodes, at least one individual, often a key figure such as a U.S. Air Force intelligence officer (in the episode "The Innocent"), a police officer (in "Genesis" and "The Spores"), a U.S. Army major ("Doomsday Minus One"), or a NASA official ("Moonshot") would become aware of the alien threat and survive the episode in which he or she was introduced. In "The Leeches", a millionaire (Arthur Hill) survives an alien abduction after being rescued by Vincent, while in "Quantity: Unknown" a scientist (Susan Strasberg) is convinced of alien technology. In "The Saucer", guest stars Anne Francis and Charles Drake witness an alien saucer's landing. In the second season, larger groups of surviving witnesses were featured, as in episodes "Dark Outpost" and "The Pursued", and three scientists in "Labyrinth". Most significant of these is millionaire industrialist Edgar Scoville (Kent Smith), who became a semiregular character as of December 1967, heading a small but influential group from the episode "The Believers". Later episodes had the military involved ("The Peacemaker"), as Vincent's claims were now clearly being taken more seriously. In "The Miracle" (guest star Barbara Hershey), after an alien encounter, Vincent manages to retain a piece of alien technology both as evidence and for examination by both his group and the authorities.

The series depicted an undercurrent of at least partial credulity among authority figures regarding Vincent's claims, even in the first season, as in early episodes such as "The Mutation", where a security agent (Lin McCarthy) is keeping an eye on Vincent and ends up inclined to believe him. In "The Innocent", the USAF officer (Dabney Coleman) guns down an alien who incinerates in front of him, tying in with Vincent's claims, while at the end of the episode after apparently disbelieving Vincent, he then phones USAF security to run a full background check on an officer whom Vincent claimed was an alien. In "Moonshot", the NASA official (Peter Graves) is fully expecting Vincent to arrive, and in "Condition: Red", a NORAD officer and staff witness an alien UFO formation onscreen, and are left convinced. Each of these incidents is kept to just the individual episode, with hinted official backing of Vincent (or at least 'semibacking' suggested in the episode "The Condemned"). Elsewhere, Vincent is shown as being publicly 'dismissed as a crank' by the authorities, while behind the scenes they apparently take him seriously—for example in "Doomsday Minus One", where Vincent has been invited by an Army intelligence official and then is given classified information; in the two-part "Summit Meeting" where he is present at a top security meeting without any question; and in "Condition: Red" where he is allowed into NORAD without question. Thus, viewers were left to draw their own conclusions as to the situation regarding Vincent's actual standing.

Some controversy arose regarding the sudden ending of the television series after season two, as it was deemed no proper ending had been written (unlike The Fugitive, another Quinn Martin show). Yet the final season-two episode "Inquisition" does stand as some kind of series conclusion where Vincent finally convinces a key figure, an initially skeptical special assistant to the Attorney General (Mark Richman), that the Invaders have arrived, after first defeating an alien plan to use a special weapon. The aliens had withdrawn all their key personnel from Earth prior to its use, and the closing narration is that Vincent, Edgar Scoville, and the now convinced Special Assistant will join forces as the vanguard to watch for any return of the Invaders. Thus, this episode can be seen as showing Vincent achieve his goal of 'convincing disbelieving authorities' at least, and the Invaders' plans temporarily thwarted, leaving the door open for any possible later sequel or spinoff series.

Characteristics of the invaders
The emphasis of the series is on Vincent and his efforts, and unlike most science fiction the back story of the aliens—their "dying" planet in "another galaxy" (or even their names)—is "a deliberate blank". They appear human except for a few telltale characteristics (they lack a pulse, the ability to bleed, or show emotion, and many have a deformed fourth finger). While the disguised aliens can be killed by humans, they glow red and disintegrate when this happens, eliminating evidence of their existence. The aliens are shown in their true form in only two episodes. In "Genesis" (season one, episode five), an ill alien researcher loses his human form and is briefly seen immersed in a tank of water.  "The Enemy" has a dying, mutated Invader (Richard Anderson) revert to his true appearance. Unless they receive periodic treatments in what Vincent calls "regeneration chambers", which consume a great deal of electrical power, they revert to their alien form. One scene in the series showed an alien beginning to revert, filmed in soft focus and with pulsating red light.

Most of the aliens, in particular the lowest-ranking members or workers in green jumpsuits, are emotionless and have deformed little fingers that can not move and are bent at an unnatural angle, although  "deluxe models" could manipulate this finger. Black aliens' palms were not pale, like humans of African descent, but were the same shade as the rest of their skins. Some mutants experience emotions similar to those of humans and even oppose the alien takeover.

When aliens die, their bodies  glow red and burn up along with their clothes and anything else they were touching, preventing the documenting of their existence. On several occasions, a dying alien would deliberately touch a piece of their technology to prevent it from falling into the hands of humans.  In episode three ("The Mutation"), a female alien who falls for Vincent and is killed while running to warn him he is in danger, tells him, "That's what happens to us when we die here on Earth."

Technology of the invaders
The type of spaceship by which the Invaders reach the Earth is a flying saucer of a design resembling early 1950s photographs of alleged UFOs produced by self-proclaimed UFO "contactee" George Adamski. They differ slightly from Adamski's images in not having three spheres on the underside, but instead five shallower protrusions. Numerous pieces of alien technology featured "penta" or five-sided designs. It was a principle of the production crew to show The Invaders' technology with set, prop designs, and control panels that were utterly alien from the conventional human ones (such as H. R. Giger would later present in Alien).

To kill humans they apply a small, handheld, disc-shaped weapon with five glowing white lights to the back of the victim's head or neck to induce a seemingly natural death, which is usually diagnosed as a cerebral hemorrhage. They also employ weapons that disintegrate witnesses, vehicles, and when necessary, members of their own race with some sort of ray. Also in their arsenal is a small device consisting of two spinning, transparent crystals joined at their corners, which acts like a truth serum, forces human beings to do the aliens' bidding, or (in most cases) to impose the complete loss of memory of previous events.

Themes
According to producer Alan A. Armer, "The major thing that the show had going for it is the fact that we are all a little bit paranoid, and that it’s easy to identify with ... one person fighting the society, fighting the government, fighting an invisible force ...”  Creator of the series Larry Cohen describes Hitchcock as a major influence.

Of course The Invaders was definitely in the same genre as The Fugitive: a man moving across America, in search of something, and in jeopardy.  Really, to me, my idea was taken more from Alfred Hitchcock than it was taken from The Fugitive.  I always liked the Hitchcock movie where the hero is in a situation where he's the only one that knows the spies are operating, and no one will believe him.  And when he takes the police back to the locale where he saw their operation, everything has been removed, there's no more evidence, everybody lies and says that he was never there before.

Such Hitchcock movies include The 39 Steps (1935) with Robert Donat, Saboteur (1942) with Robert Cummings, and of course North by Northwest (1959) with Cary Grant.

The large numbers of UFO reports in the post-World War II era was the subject of paranoia and conspiracy, as scientists and authorities (the Condon Committee and the Robertson Panel), and debunkers (Committee for Skeptical Inquiry), dismissed or downplayed the reports; and dedicated "ufologists" made sometimes-outlandish claims of alien presence on Earth and of earthly conspiracies to suppress evidence of it. Interest in the subject of UFOs became fringe, and "a punchline" in popular culture.

Cold War allegory
For many viewers, the theme of paranoia infusing The Invaders often appeared to reflect Cold War realities of communist infiltration that had lingered from the McCarthy period a decade earlier. Series creator Larry Cohen has acknowledged that this was intended, along with a political theme for the series. In audio commentary for the episode "The Innocent", included in the first-season DVD collection, Cohen said his knowledge of the blacklisting of Hollywood screenwriters for their communist connections inspired him to make "a documentary" of the fear of the infiltration of society, by substituting space aliens for communists.

Cohen also acknowledged he was not the first to turn Cold War fears into science-fiction drama; such fears had influenced such films as Invasion of the Body Snatchers and especially I Married a Monster from Outer Space. Cohen also stated in his commentary that the political intent inherent in some of his creations, including The Invaders, was not always appreciated or shared by left-wing producers and actors.

In an interview shown in the special-features segment included on the DVD release of Invasion of the Body Snatchers, star Kevin McCarthy strongly denied any desire by director Don Siegel or the film's writer to connect the invaders to communists.

Cast
 Roy Thinnes appears as David Vincent in all 43 episodes.  For the first 30 episodes, he is the only recurring character.
 Kent Smith appears as Edgar Scoville for 13 episodes, beginning with episode 31, "The Believers".  Scoville heads a small group called The Believers, who accept David Vincent's claims of alien invasion.  None of the other Believers are series regulars, and are typically only seen briefly on-screen as extras or in bit roles. 
 Lin McCarthy appears as Col. Archie Harmon, a skeptical friend of Scoville's, in two episodes.
 Alfred Ryder appears as an Invaders leader in three episodes. He is almost certainly not playing the same character in all three episodes, but may be playing the same character in his final two appearances. 
 Max Kleven appears as an unnamed Alien in five episodes, but he is almost certainly not meant to be the same alien in each appearance.

Production

Development
The series was produced by Quinn Martin, who was looking for a show to replace the immensely popular The Fugitive, which was ending its run in 1967. Larry Cohen, the series' creator, had conceived two earlier series with similarities to The Invaders. Chuck Connors starred in Branded (1965) as a soldier court-martialed for cowardice, who traveled the West searching for witnesses and proof that he had acted valiantly, and Coronet Blue (1967) about Michael Alden, a man suffering from amnesia who was being pursued by a powerful group of people. All he could remember were the words "Coronet Blue".

Another inspiration was the wave of "alien Doppelgänger" films which had come 10 years before in the 1950s, typified by Invasion of the Body Snatchers (1956) and the British film Quatermass 2 (1957), known in America as Enemy from Space.  While these paranoid tales of extraterrestrials who lived among us, posing as humans while planning a takeover, are usually linked with a Red Scare subtext, Martin simply wanted a premise that would keep the hero moving around and that would explain why he could not go to the authorities (i.e. not only had some aliens infiltrated human institutions already, but most humans would dismiss a claim of alien invasion as a paranoid delusion). However, as the series unfolded, the various 'disappearances' of people in episodes (killed by the Invaders, such as Vincent's partner Alan Landers—played by James Daly—in the pilot, etc.), those installed alien figures revealed to be aliens by Vincent thus having to withdraw (such as Edward Andrews' character in "The Mutation", etc.) plus the surviving one or two key human witnesses in most episodes (from the third episode onwards) did rather alter the basic premise of the show to something deeper and more thought-provoking early on.

Season one was produced in association with the ABC Television Network or as it was listed in the end credits, "The American Broadcasting Company Television Networks".

Opening sequence
Before each episode, an "in color" promo bumper, typical of most ABC programs of the era, appears, as ABC was the last network to adopt color programming: Next... The Invaders, In Color!

Then, following the bumper, each episode begins with a cold open, to help set up the plot of the episode to come. After the prologue, the main title appears, announced by Dick Wesson:

The Invaders! A Quinn Martin Production. Starring Roy Thinnes as architect David Vincent.

(A different shot of Thinnes' face was used for the second season.) This would be followed by the opening narration (by Bill Woodson):

The Invaders, alien beings from a dying planet. Their destination: the Earth. Their purpose: to make it their world. David Vincent has seen them. For him, it began one lost night on a lonely country road, looking for a shortcut that he never found. It began with a closed deserted diner, and a man too long without sleep to continue his journey. It began with the landing of a craft from another galaxy. Now David Vincent knows that the Invaders are here, that they have taken human form. Somehow he must convince a disbelieving world that the nightmare has already begun.

Then, in a manner typical of Quinn Martin productions, Wesson would announce, "The guest stars in tonight's story...", and announce the name of each guest star (typically three or four) over a series of close-up clips of the guest stars.  Wesson would then announce "Tonight's Episode", and say the title of the episode about to be viewed, which would also appear on screen.

Dominic Frontiere, who had provided scores for Twelve O'Clock High and The Outer Limits, provided scores for The Invaders as well.

Episodes

Season 1 (1967)

Season 2 (1967–68)

Home media
CBS DVD (distributed by Paramount) has released the entire series on DVD in Regions 1, 2 & PAL 4.

On June 5, 2018, CBS Home Entertainment released The Invaders: The Complete Series on DVD in Region 1.

Thinnes also provided audio commentary for the official The Invaders DVD releases. He has also filmed special video introductions for every 
episode, which are an optional "Play" feature on the episode menus. The "in color" bumper follows each of these introductions. Since the 1960s, recurring public interest in UFO lore may have helped to revive interest in the television series, and commentary on the DVD collections acknowledges that, in private life, Thinnes has kept up a strong interest in UFO-related information.

On May 5, 2019, "classic-TV" digital/basic-cable network MeTV began weekly airings of The Invaders as part of its "Red-Eye Sci-Fi Saturday Night" late Saturday evening/early Sunday morning programming lineup.

Spin-offs and remakes

Quinn Martin's Tales of the Unexpected (1977)
The pilot episode of the series, "Beachhead", was remade in 1977 for another Quinn Martin series, Quinn Martin's Tales of the Unexpected (known in the United Kingdom as Twist in the Tale), where it was retitled "The Nomads".

The Invaders miniseries (1995)
In 1995, the premise was used as the basis for a four-hour television miniseries remake titled The Invaders on Fox. Scott Bakula starred as Nolan Wood, who discovers the alien conspiracy, and Roy Thinnes very briefly appeared as David Vincent, now an old man handing the burden over to Wood.  The miniseries has been released in some countries on home video, edited into a single movie. The first part aired on November 12, 1995; part 2 aired on November 14, 1995 (both in two-hour time slots).

Reuse of footage
Several seconds of footage from the opening sequence of the flying saucer approaching Earth from space appears in the opening of the episode "The Innocent Prey" of the series The Fantastic Journey. It aired on June 6, 1977. In the plot of that final episode of the series, the saucer was a prisoner transport ship of the future operated by humans that malfunctioned and crashed on Earth at night in the heavy vegetation of a jungle. The full-scale saucer used in ground scenes, however, was physically different on the outside and inside from The Invaders one.

The Invaders abroad 
The series proved to be enormously popular in France (first aired in 1969 as Les Envahisseurs), and it is still a local favorite, inspiring books, comics, songs (Les Envahisseurs by Arnold Turboust), comedy skits (Les envahisseurs by Les Inconnus), merchandise, and even TV advertising commercials.

In Italy, it became a popular "filler" for syndicated TV stations (like other 1960s series such as Hawaii Five-O and Mission: Impossible) in the 1980s.

The series also met with success in South America and Germany (Invasion von der Wega).

It was popular in the UK; it was shown there on ITV in the 1960s, with several repeat runs on BBC2 from 1983 onwards to Sunday mornings in 1993. It appeared on SciFi Channel in 2004 and 2013, and the seasons played throughout on Horror Channel during summer of 2017, 2018 and mid summer of 2019.

Very popular in Spain, it inspired the name of a weekly street market in Albacete, still called Los Invasores as the market stalls invade the streets.

Despite its alleged allegory of the Cold War, the series also made it across the Iron Curtain into Hungary, where it was dubbed and aired under the title "Attack from an Alien Planet" (Hungarian: Támadás egy idegen bolygóról) between July 4 and September 5, 1980. The whole series was never shown, with only the black and white versions of the following 9 episodes making it to the TV screens after prime time on Friday nights, in the sequence indicated (Season/Episode): 1/1, 1/11, 1/13, 2/12, 2/14, 1/4, 2/7, 2/6, 2/21. These 9 episodes were described in the media as the complete series, with no reference made to the existence of any other episodes. Newspaper reviews tended to be critical of the show being "more fiction than science". It was nevertheless well received by viewers, as attested by references to it in popular culture at the time. Romanian state TV also broadcast both seasons sometime around 1970.

In other media

Books 
Ten books based on the television series have been published.

 Army of the Undead by Rafe Bernard (US, Pyramid Books, 1967) – the same story as Halo Highway
 The Autumn Accelerator by Peter Leslie (UK, Corgi (a Transworld imprint), 1967)
 Enemies from Beyond by Keith Laumer (US, Pyramid Books, 1967)
 Halo Highway by Rafe Bernard (UK, Corgi, 1967) – the same story as Army of the Undead
 The Invaders by Keith Laumer (US, Pyramid Books, 1967)
 Meteor Men by Keith Laumer (writing as Anthony Le Baron) (UK, Corgi, 1967)
 Dam of Death by Jack Pearl (US, Whitman (a Western Publishing imprint), 1967)
 The Invaders: Alien Missile Threat by Paul S. Newman (US, a Big Little Book from Whitman, 1967)
 Night of the Trilobites by Peter Leslie (UK, Corgi, 1969)
 The Invaders by Jim Rosin (US, Autumn Road Company, 2010)

Comics
 Gold Key Comics published four issues of an Invaders comic book based upon the series in 1967–1968, years before Marvel Comics published their own, unrelated Invaders superhero series.
 Whitman Publishing published a Big Little Book of the show titled Alien Missile Threat in 1967 as part of its 2000 Series (#2012).

In popular culture
 The struggles of David Vincent are referenced in the Frank Black song "Bad, Wicked World" (on his 1994 album Teenager of the Year): "An architect named David Vincent / A man too long without sleep / He took a wrong turn and people just laughed / [...] / Fist-throwing crusader / Against invaders"
 MAD magazine issue No. 119 (June 1968), presented a TV satire of The Invaders titled "The Invasioners".
 Plastic model kits of the UFO (flying saucer) were made by Aurora and Monogram.
 The 1977 novel The Rombella Shuttle by Bill Convertito used the craft on the cover art.
 In the 2002 Argentinian movie Kamchatka, which is set in 1976, the protagonists watch an episode on TV and there is an analogy between the invaders and the events of the Argentine military dictatorship of the 1970s. The leads use the alias "los Vicentes" after David Vincent character to hide their identities.

Notes

Citations

Explanatory notes

External links
 
 The Invaders at Classic TV History (behind-the-scene history, episodes full credits)
 The Invaders informational episode Guide
 The Invaders informational web site

1960s American science fiction television series
Alien invasions in television
1967 American television series debuts
1968 American television series endings
English-language television shows
Saturn Award-winning television series
Television shows filmed in California
Television shows set in California
American Broadcasting Company original programming
Television series by CBS Studios
Television series created by Larry Cohen
Gold Key Comics titles
Television shows adapted into comics